Francine Prose (born April 1, 1947) is an American novelist, short story writer, essayist, and critic. She is a visiting professor of literature at Bard College, and was formerly president of PEN American Center.

Life and career
Born in Brooklyn, Prose graduated from Radcliffe College in 1968. She received the PEN Translation Prize in 1988 and received a Guggenheim Fellowship in 1991. Prose's novel The Glorious Ones has been adapted into a musical with the same title by Lynn Ahrens and Stephen Flaherty. It ran at the Mitzi E. Newhouse Theater at Lincoln Center in New York City in the fall of 2007.

In March 2007, Prose was chosen to succeed American writer Ron Chernow beginning in April to serve a one-year term as president of PEN American Center, a New York City-based literary society of writers, editors and translators that works to advance literature, defend free expression, and foster international literary fellowship. In March 2008, Prose ran unopposed for a second one-year term as PEN American Center president. That same month, London artist Sebastian Horsley had been denied entry into the United States and PEN president Prose subsequently invited Horsley to speak at PEN's annual festival of international literature in New York at the end of April 2008. She was succeeded by philosopher and novelist Kwame Anthony Appiah as president of PEN in April 2009.

Prose sat on the board of judges for the PEN/Newman's Own Award. Her novel, Blue Angel, a satire about sexual harassment on college campuses, was a finalist for the National Book Award. One of her novels, Household Saints, was adapted for a movie by Nancy Savoca.

Prose received the Rome Prize in 2006.

In 2010, Prose received the Washington University International Humanities Medal. The medal, awarded biennially and accompanied by a cash prize of $25,000, is given to honor a person whose humanistic endeavors in scholarship, journalism, literature, or the arts have made a difference in the world. Other winners include Turkish novelist Orhan Pamuk in 2006, journalist Michael Pollan in 2008, and documentary filmmaker Ken Burns in 2012.

American PEN criticism

During the 2015 controversy regarding American PEN's decision to honor Charlie Hebdo with its annual Freedom of Expression Courage Award, she, alongside Michael Ondaatje, Teju Cole, Peter Carey, Rachel Kushner and Taiye Selasi, withdrew from the group's annual awards gala and signed a letter dissociating themselves from the award, stating that although the murders were "sickening and tragic," they did not believe that Charlie Hebdos work deserved an award. The letter was soon co-signed by more than 140 other PEN members. Prose published an article in The Guardian justifying her position, stating that: "the narrative of the Charlie Hebdo murders—white Europeans killed in their offices by Muslim extremists—is one that feeds neatly into the cultural prejudices that have allowed our government to make so many disastrous mistakes in the Middle East." Prose was criticized for her views by Katha Pollitt, Alex Massie, Michael C. Moynihan, Nick Cohen and others, most notably by Salman Rushdie, who in a letter to PEN described Prose and the five other authors who withdrew as fellow travellers of "fanatical Islam, which is highly organised, well funded, and which seeks to terrify us all, Muslims as well as non-Muslims, into a cowed silence."

The New Yorker controversy
On January 7, 2018, in a Facebook post, Prose accused the author Sadia Shepard of plagiarizing Mavis Gallant's "The Ice Wagon Going Down the Street", which had appeared in The New Yorker on December 14, 1963. Shepard's piece had been published online by The New Yorker and was scheduled for release in the January 8, 2018 issue. Though Shepard's story reimagines the original in a new context, with added detail and altered character dynamics, Prose contended that the similarities between the two stories constituted theft, writing in her original post that the story is a "scene by scene, plot-turn by plot-turn, gesture by gesture, line-of-dialogue by line-of-dialogue copy—the only major difference being that the main characters are Pakistanis in Connecticut during the Trump era instead of Canadians in post-WWII Geneva." In a letter to The New Yorker, Prose maintained her original stance, asking, "Is it really acceptable to change the names and the identities of fictional characters and then claim the story as one's own original work? Why, then, do we bother with copyrights?" Responding to Prose's accusation, Shepard acknowledged her debt to Gallant but maintained that her use of Gallant's story of self-exile in postwar Europe to explore the immigrant experience of Pakistani Muslims in today's America was justified.

Bibliography

Novels

 1973: Judah the Pious, Atheneum (Macmillan reissue 1986 )
 1974: The Glorious Ones, Atheneum (Harper Perennial reissue 2007 )
 1977: Marie Laveau, Berkley Publishing Corp.
 1978: Animal Magnetism, G.P. Putnam's Sons.
 1981: Household Saints, St. Martin's Press
 1983: Hungry Hearts, Pantheon
 1986: Bigfoot Dreams, Pantheon
 1992: Primitive People, Farrar, Straus & Giroux
 1995: Hunters and Gatherers, Farrar, Straus & Giroux
 2000: Blue Angel, Harper Perennial
 2003: After, HarperCollins
 2005: A Changed Man, HarperCollins – winner of the 2006 Dayton Literary Peace Prize for fiction
 2007: Bullyville, HarperTeen
 2008: Goldengrove, HarperCollins
 2009: Touch, HarperTeen
 2011: My New American Life, Harper
 2012: The Turning, HarperTeen
 2014: Lovers at the Chameleon Club, Paris 1932, Harper
 2016: Mister Monkey, Harper,
 2021: The Vixen, Harper

Short story collections
 1988: Women and Children First, Pantheon
 1997: Guided Tours of Hell, Metropolitan
 1998: The Peaceable Kingdom, Farrar Straus & Giroux

Children's picture books
 2005: Leopold, the Liar of Leipzig, illustrated by Einav Aviram, HarperCollins,

Nonfiction
 2002: The Lives of the Muses: Nine Women and the Artists They Inspired, HarperCollins
 2003: Gluttony, Oxford University Press – second in a series about the seven deadly sins
 2003: Sicilian Odyssey, National Geographic
 2005: Caravaggio: Painter of Miracles, Eminent Lives
 2006: Reading Like a Writer, HarperCollins
 2008: The Photographs of Marion Post Wolcott. Washington, DC: Library of Congress
 2009: Anne Frank: The Book, the Life, the Afterlife, HarperCollins
 2015: Peggy Guggenheim – The Shock of the Modern, Yale University Press
 2020: Titian's Pietro Aretino (with Xavier F. Salomon), The Frick Collection
 2022: Cleopatra: Her History, Her Myth, Yale University Press

Book reviews
March 13, 2005: "'The Glass Castle': Outrageous Misfortune": The Glass Castle, by Jeannette Walls
May 22, 2005: "'Oh the Glory of It All': Poor Little Rich Boy": Oh the Glory of It All, by Sean Wilsey
June 12, 2005: "'Marriage, a History': Lithuanians and Letts Do It", Marriage, a History: From Obedience to Intimacy, Or How Love Conquered Marriage, by Stephanie Coontz
 December 4, 2005: "Slayer of Taboos", The New York Times: D. H. Lawrence: The Life of an Outsider, by John Worthen
 April 2, 2006: "Science Fiction", The New York Times: The Book About Blanche and Marie, by Per Olov Enquist
 July 9, 2006: "The Folklore of Exile", The New York Times: Last Evenings on Earth, by Roberto Bolaño
 December 2008: "More is More: Roberto Bolaño's Magnum Opus", Harper's Magazine: 2666, by Roberto Bolaño
 December/January 2010: "Altar Ego", Bookforum: Ayn Rand and the World She Made, by Anne C. Heller

Awards 

 1974: National Jewish Book Award for Judah the Pious
1998: National Jewish Book Award for You Never Know: A Legend of the Lamed-vavniks. Illustration by Mark Podwal

Notes

Further reading
 
 Author page at Harpercollins
 A conversation with Francine Prose on The Atlantic Online
 Prose archive from The New York Review of Books

External links

 2007 Interview  by Betsy Sussler with A. M. Homes and Francine Prose, Bomb, 16 September 2007

1947 births
Living people
20th-century American novelists
20th-century American short story writers
20th-century American women writers
21st-century American novelists
21st-century American short story writers
21st-century American women writers
American women novelists
American women short story writers
Bard College faculty
Harper's Magazine people
Harvard Advocate alumni
Iowa Writers' Workshop faculty
Novelists from Iowa
Novelists from New York (state)
Radcliffe College alumni
Writers from Brooklyn
American women academics
Members of the American Academy of Arts and Letters